Michael Murphy, (February 22 1816 March 7, 1887) was a 19th-century American New York Sandy Hook maritime pilot. He was best known for being in the Sandy Hook service for over 34 years. Murphy was captain and owner of the pilot boats,  Washington, Abraham Leggett, and Alexander M. Lawrence. He piloted the Great Eastern from Southampton to New York in 1860.

Early life

Early records indicate that Murphy's parents were from Ireland and his christening was at the St Peter and St Paul's Church in Wolverhampton, England. His birth is listed as February 22, 1816.

Murphy had three brothers, of "nautical fame," which extended from "ocean to ocean." Murphy's brother, James R. Murphy, was one of the oldest of the Sandy Hook pilots. He was born in Worcestershire, England. He too lived in Brooklyn, and died on May 8, 1873. He was buried at the  Flatbush Cemetery (now Holy Cross Cemetery, Brooklyn). Another brother, Peter C. Murphy, was also a Sandy Hook pilot on the pilot boat Washington, who died in 1864. A fourth brother, Thomas J. Murphy was also a Sandy Hook pilot on the pilot boats Washington and John D. Jones. Murphy never married.

Career

Murphy's career started in Southampton and followed the life of a sailor. He became a branch pilot with skills to navigate ships through the channel from the Sandy Hook bar to the Upper New York Bay and New York Harbor. Murphy owned and piloted the pilot boats: Washington, Abraham Leggett,  and Alexander M. Lawrence.

Washington

Murphy was part owner of the pilot boat Washington, No. 4. On May 22, 1850, Henry Grinnell was on the pilot-boat Washington, which was provided by Pilot Murphy to accompany the Arctic Expedition in search for John Franklin. Grinnell was on the boat for three days and parted the expedition 40 miles south of Montauk Point. 

On October, 10, 1860, Murphy, of the Washington, signed a statement that he was satisfied with the representation of the New York Board of Commissioners of Pilots.

Great Eastern

Murphy piloted the Great Eastern from Southampton and its arrival in New York on June, 28 1860. Murphy was captain of the pilot boat Washington, No. 4, at this time. He was selected by Mr. Sands, an agent of the Eastern who wanted a New York pilot to accompany the vessel when she arrived in New York. Murphy sailed to Europe in the steamer Teutonia on May 15, 1860.

On the ships arrival in New York, Murphy guided the Eastern through Sandy Hook and the narrow Lower New York Bay. The pilot boats Achilles and Yankee provided assistance. The Eastern was anchored off the Battery.

Abraham Leggett
[[File:Abraham Leggett, No. 4.jpg|thumb|Pilot Boat Abraham Leggett.]]

Murphy was part owner and ship master of the New York pilot-boat Abraham Leggett, No. 4, built at the  Westervelt & Co. shipyard. On September 4, 1866, a collision took place off Staten Island, between the pilot boat Abraham Leggett, and the bark Emilie. The bark had come in from sea and was in tow by a tugboat. She passed too close to the pilot boat and ran into her. The case went to the US District Court (Michael Murphy vs. The Bark Emilie), where the judge concluded that the collision was caused by the fault of the Emilie.

On March 23, 1879, Murphy, also known as Admiral Murphy, was a witness in an examination of the East River Bridge, which later opened on May 24, 1883. In his remarks, he stated that he was a pilot that lived in Brooklyn and had been a Sandy Hook pilot for 34 years. He testified that there would be no difficulty passing under the bridge in the center and that all he needed was two feet of clearance.

Alexander M. Lawrence

The New York pilot-boat Alexander M. Lawrence, No. 4, was built for Admiral Murphy and his partners on May 21, 1879. The Lawrence took the place of the Abraham Leggett, that was hit and sank by the steamship Naples in early 1879. Murphy was registered as the ship master from 1881-1885. 

On December 5, 1883, Captain Murphy, of the Lawrence, reported to the New York Pilot Commissioners the accident of the pilot boat Columbia, No. 8, which was run down and sank off Fire Island by the steamer SS Alaska.

Death

Murphy died on March 7, 1887, at age 71, in Brooklyn, New York. His funeral took place at St. James Cathedral on Jay Street in Downtown Brooklyn. In his Will, he left his interest in the pilot boat Washington to his housekeeper, Mrs. Margaret Cooper; one-sixteenth interest in the pilot boat Alexander M. Lawrence, which he bequeathed to his nephew Francis Connor, and one-eighth interest in the Lawrence'' to his brother Thomas Murphy.

See also

 List of Northeastern U. S. Pilot Boats

References

People from New York (state)
1887 deaths
1816 births
Sea captains
Maritime pilotage